Bis(5'-adenosyl)-triphosphatase also known as fragile histidine triad protein (FHIT) is an enzyme that in humans is encoded by the FHIT gene.

Function 

FHIT is also known as human accelerated region 10.  It may, therefore, have played a key role in differentiating humans from apes.

This gene, a member of the histidine triad gene family, encodes a diadenosine  	
P1,P3-bis(5'-adenosyl)-triphosphate adenylohydrolase involved in purine metabolism. The gene encompasses the common fragile site FRA3B on chromosome 3, where carcinogen-induced damage can lead to translocations and aberrant transcripts of this gene. In fact, aberrant transcripts from this gene have been found in about half of all esophageal, stomach, and colon carcinomas.

Though the exact molecular function of FHIT is still partially unclear, the gene works as a tumor suppressor as it has been demonstrated in animal studies. Furthermore FHIT has been shown to synergize with VHL, another tumor suppressor, in protecting against chemically - induced lung cancer.

FHIT also acts as a tumor suppressor of HER2/neu driven breast cancer.

Interactions 

FHIT has been shown to interact with UBE2I.

References

External links